The 2021 Poland Open was an amateur wrestling event held in Warsaw, Poland between 8 and 13 June 2021. It served as the last United World Wrestling Ranking Series event of the year and played a role with regard to the 2020 Summer Olympics and 2021 World Championships' seeding. The event consisted of three competitions: the Waclaw Ziolkowski Memorial (men's freestyle wrestling), Wladyslaw Pytlasinski Cup (men's Greco-Roman wrestling) and Poland Open (women's wrestling).

Medal table

Team ranking

Medal overview

Men's freestyle (Waclaw Ziolkowski Memorial) 
June 8–9

Men's Greco-Roman (Wladyslaw Pytlasinski Cup) 
12–13 June

Women's freestyle (Poland Open) 
10–11 June

Participating nations

284 competitors from 40 nations participated.
 (8)
 (6)
 (2)
 (3)
 (1)
 (5)
 (1)
 (2)
 (4)
 (8)
 (6)
 (2)
 (4)
 (9)
 (9)
 (1)
 (13)
 (2)
 (1)
 (14)
 (5)
 (4)
 (3)
 (1)
 (4)
 (6)
 (1)
 (39)
 (22)
 (17)
 (1)
 (2)
 (1)
 (2)
 (3)
 (1)
 (20)
 (23)
 (21)
 (17)

References

External links 
 Results Book

Poland Open
Poland Open
International wrestling competitions hosted by Poland
Sports competitions in Warsaw
Poland Open